The Watkins Manor House is a historic mansion in Winona, Minnesota, United States.  It was  built from 1924 to 1927 for Paul Watkins (1865–1931), second-generation leader of the J.R. Watkins Company and progenitor of its famous door-to-door sales strategy.  It was designed in the Jacobethan style by architect Ralph Adams Cram.  The house was listed on the National Register of Historic Places in 1984 as the Paul Watkins House for its local significance in the themes of architecture and commerce.  It was nominated for its associations with Paul Watkins and the Watkins Company, and for its architecture, being a rare and unaltered example of a house designed by an architect better known for his churches and institutional buildings.

The manor is now part of a senior housing complex, containing apartments and community spaces.

See also
 National Register of Historic Places listings in Winona County, Minnesota

References

External links

 Senior Living at Watkins

1927 establishments in Minnesota
Buildings and structures in Winona, Minnesota
Houses completed in 1927
Houses in Winona County, Minnesota
Houses on the National Register of Historic Places in Minnesota
Jacobean architecture in the United States
National Register of Historic Places in Winona County, Minnesota
Ralph Adams Cram buildings